Jarrett Burton (born December 30, 1990) is a Canadian professional ice hockey centre currently playing for the Stavanger Oilers in the Eliteserien (NOR).

Playing career
Undrafted, Burton played minor junior hockey with the Kingston Voyageurs in the Ontario Junior Hockey League, before pursuing an American collegiate career with Clarkson University.

Following his senior year with the Golden Knights, Burton made his professional debut with the Wheeling Nailers in the ECHL to end the 2013–14 season.

Burton played five seasons in the AHL with the Wilkes-Barre/Scranton Penguins and the Rochester Americans before signing a one-year contract as a free agent with the Iowa Wild, primary affiliate to the Minnesota Wild on August 3, 2020.

Following the 2020–21 season with the Iowa Wild, having made 253 career appearances, Burton left the AHL to sign a one-year European contract with Norwegian based Stavanger Oilers of the Fjordkraftligaen on July 7, 2021.

Career statistics

References

External links

1990 births
Living people
Canadian ice hockey centres
Clarkson Golden Knights men's ice hockey players
Iowa Wild players
Rochester Americans players
Wheeling Nailers players
Wilkes-Barre/Scranton Penguins players